At least three ships of the French Navy have been named Kersaint:

 , a  launched in 1931 and sunk in 1942
 , a  launched in 1953 and expended as a target in 1986
 , an aviso designed in 1897

French Navy ship names